Fossum Bridge (Fossum bru) is a  bridge  crossing the river Glomma at Askim in Viken county, Norway.  The old wooden bridge was an arch bridge with two spans which opened in 1856. That bridge was partly destroyed in the Battle of Fossum Bridge during the Nazi invasion of Norway in April 1940. The current bridge dates from 1961  and is a suspension bridge with a main span of 125 metres.

References

Related reading
Haugen, Dag B.  (1990) Indre Østfold i krig : en berettelse om kampene i Indre Østfold for 50 år siden

Bridges completed in 1856
Road bridges in Viken
Suspension bridges in Norway